Arikapú or Maxubí is an endangered Yabutian language.

Loukotka (1968) lists Arikapú and Maxubí as separate languages. Arikapú is spoken on the Branco River south of the Tuparí tribe. Maxubí is spoken on the Mequéns River.

Speakers
In 1998, Arikapú was spoken by only six individuals in Rondônia, Brazil, at the headwaters of the Rio Branco. By 2015, Djeoromitxi (2015) reported there were only two remaining speakers, namely the two sisters Nazaré Wadjidjika Arikapu and Nambuika Arikapu. It is being supplanted by Portuguese.

Phonology

Nasalisation is indicated by a tilde on the vowel : .

References

External links
 Arikapú basic lexicon at the Global Lexicostatistical Database

Critically endangered languages
Mamoré–Guaporé linguistic area
Yabutian languages